
This is a list of popular parks and gardens in Lahore, often called the city of gardens.

Parks and gardens
Shahdara Bagh
Shalimar Gardens
Hazuri Bagh
Lawrence Garden
Islamia Park
Nasir Bagh
Model Town Park
Sukh Chayn Gardens
Jilani Park
Jam-e-Shirin Park
National Bank Park
Oasis Golf and Aqua Resort
Punjab society park
Riwaz Garden
Zaman Park
Sajawal Park Township Lahore

Amusement parks

Adventure Park, opp Main Gate Bahria Town
Gulshan Iqbal Park
Jallo Park
Jilani Park
Joyland
Sozo Water Park
 National Bank Park
Oasis Golf and Aqua Resort
Skyland Water Park
Battlefield Lahore Airport Road
Baoli Amusement Park

Botanical gardens

Danishmandan Botanic Garden
Government College University Botanic Garden
Lahore Botanical Gardens

Zoological gardens

Changa Manga Wildlife Park
Jallo Wildlife Park
Lahore Zoo
Lahore Zoo Safari (also called Woodland Wildlife Park)

Gallery

See also
List of parks and gardens in Karachi
List of places in Lahore
List of sports venues in Lahore
List of botanical gardens in Pakistan
List of zoos in Pakistan
List of parks and gardens in Pakistan
List of urban parks by size

References

External links
List of plant nurseries in Lahore

 01
Lahore-related lists
Lahore

Lahore